Sati - Satya Ki Shakti is an Indian television soap opera that aired on Sahara One channel. The show premiered on 29 May 2006.

Premise
The story is of a woman named Sati who stands and fights for her rights and those of many other women in the society. She is a lawyer who not only litigates and wins criminal cases on the show but who also answers actual questions from viewers and helps fight real-life cases. Sati's personal saga is also revealed: her vulnerability in trusting people too easily, her relationship with the man she loves, and her dry sense of humour.

Cast 
 Manasi Salvi as Advocate Sati Razdan
 Ayub Khan
 Sonia Kapoor as Sanika
 Kiran Bhargava as Urmila Arvind Razdan
 Rishina Kandhari as Anu Razdan
 Vineet Raina as Aarth Razdan
 Dimple Hirji as Smriti Thakur
 Dimple Inamdar as Advocate Priya Das
 Sandeep Rajora as Advocate Siddharth Raichand
 Hrishikesh Pandey
 Tarun Khanna
 Sanjay Mitra
 Karan Veer Mehra as Rajdeep Sikand
 Abhay Bhargava as Arvind Razdan
 Pallavi Subhash Chandran

References

External links 
 Official Website on Sahara One

2006 Indian television series debuts
2006 Indian television series endings
Sahara One original programming
Indian drama television series
Indian television soap operas